Meiacanthus nigrolineatus, the blackline fangblenny, is a blenny from the Western Indian Ocean.  This species grows to a length of  TL. This venomous species occasionally makes its way into the aquarium trade.

References

nigrolineatus
Fish described in 1969